Moritz Milatz (born 24 June 1982) is a German cross-country mountain biker. At the 2012 Summer Olympics, he competed in the Men's cross-country at Hadleigh Farm, finishing in 34th place.  Previously, he had finished in 16th place at the 2008 Summer Olympics. At the 2016 Summer Olympics, he finished in 28th place.

References

External links

German male cyclists
Cross-country mountain bikers
Sportspeople from Freiburg im Breisgau
Living people
Olympic cyclists of Germany
Cyclists at the 2008 Summer Olympics
Cyclists at the 2012 Summer Olympics
Cyclists at the 2016 Summer Olympics
1982 births
German mountain bikers
Cyclists from Baden-Württemberg